Steven May (born 10 January 1992) is an Australian rules footballer playing for the Melbourne Football Club in the Australian Football League (AFL). He served as the co-captain of Gold Coast in the 2017 and 2018 seasons.

Early life
Steven May was born in Darwin into a family of Indigenous Australian descent (Gunbalanya and Larrakia).

Junior football
May began playing his junior football at Southern Districts Football Club who compete in the Northern Territory Football League. His performances for Southern Districts earned him a scholarship at the AIS in 2008. Later in 2008 he moved to Melbourne to complete his final years of schooling at Melbourne Grammar. His highlights included an outing against Scotch College in which he kicked 9 goals. While competing for the Northern Territory at the 2010 AFL Under 18 Championships, he was named at full forward in the under 18 All-Australian team. Following his efforts at the National Championships, the newly formed Gold Coast Football Club signed him as one of their two priority zone selections from the Northern Territory. May would finish the 2010 season for Melbourne Grammar in the Associated Public Schools of Victoria competition with 40 goals from eight games, as well as the best and fairest award. Following graduation, he relocated to the Gold Coast at the end of 2010 to begin his AFL career.

AFL career
May made his AFL debut against Essendon in round 6 of the 2011 season where he was used as a defender. May finished the 2011 AFL season with nine games and played in defence majority of the year. May was again used in defence for most of the 2012 AFL season until round 21 against Hawthorn where he had his breakout game when moved forward. He would kick three goals and take twelve marks in an impressive display up forward for the Suns.

In a 2014 match against the Sydney Swans, May played in defence on two-time Coleman Medallist Lance Franklin and played very well, limiting him to only three goals. On 16 April 2016, May knocked out Stefan Martin after leaving his feet to deliver a full-body hit after the ball had gone by. He was suspended for five games.

May was named co-captain of the Gold Coast Football Club in December 2016, making him just the sixth indigenous captain in VFL/AFL history.

On 24 May 2017, it was announced that he would wear number 67 on his guernsey, rather than his usual 17, for the round 10 Sir Doug Nicholls Indigenous Round game against . This was to commemorate the 1967 referendum which allowed Indigenous Australians to be counted with the general population in the census.

His initial period at Melbourne in 2019 was impacted by injuries and he had a slow start. However, since the initial year, his impact and contribution to the Melbourne backline has been outstanding alongside Jake Lever and Adam Tomlinson . By round 7 in 2021 he averaged 20.2 disposals per match, 16.7 kicks and 6.8 marks. Melbourne remained undefeated, on top of the ladder at that point conceding the least number of points(434) of any team at that point in the season.

May won his first AFL Premiership with Melbourne as his team defeated Western Bulldogs in the 2021 AFL Grand Final, despite having to play with a serious hamstring injury.

In June 2022, May was suspended for one match following a public altercation with teammate Jake Melksham and also drinking alcohol while under the concussion protocols. Sources within the club said that the drunken scuffle was the result of Melksham's comments on May's drinking habit.

Statistics
Updated to the end of round 1, 2022.

|- 
| 2011 ||  || 45
| 9 || 0 || 1 || 76 || 34 || 110 || 34 || 17 || 0.0 || 0.1 || 8.4 || 3.8 || 12.2 || 3.8 || 1.9 || 0
|-
| 2012 ||  || 45
| 8 || 5 || 2 || 64 || 28 || 92 || 41 || 13 || 0.6 || 0.3 || 8.0 || 3.5 || 11.5 || 5.1 || 1.6 || 1
|- 
| 2013 ||  || 17
| 17 || 10 || 6 || 113 || 59 || 172 || 57 || 26 || 0.6 || 0.4 || 6.6 || 3.5 || 10.1 || 3.4 || 1.5 || 0
|-
| 2014 ||  || 17
| 19 || 0 || 1 || 200 || 54 || 254 || 73 || 43 || 0.0 || 0.1 || 10.5 || 2.8 || 13.4 || 3.8 || 2.3 || 3
|- 
| 2015 ||  || 17
| 18 || 0 || 3 || 171 || 78 || 249 || 76 || 18 || 0.0 || 0.2 || 9.5 || 4.3 || 13.8 || 4.2 || 1.0 || 1
|-
| 2016 ||  || 17
| 17 || 2 || 0 || 177 || 104 || 281 || 110 || 32 || 0.1 || 0.0 || 10.4 || 6.1 || 16.5 || 6.5 || 1.9 || 5
|- 
| 2017 ||  || 17/67
| 18 || 1 || 2 || 234 || 113 || 347 || 127 || 24 || 0.1 || 0.1 || 13.0 || 6.3 || 19.3 || 7.1 || 1.3 || 2
|-
| 2018 ||  || 17
| 17 || 3 || 3 || 224 || 71 || 295 || 127 || 29 || 0.2 || 0.2 || 13.2 || 4.2 || 17.4 || 7.5 || 1.7 || 1
|- 
| 2019 ||  || 1
| 8 || 1 || 2 || 104 || 17 || 121 || 30 || 9 || 0.1 || 0.3 || 13.0 || 2.1 || 15.1 || 3.8 || 1.1 || 0
|-
| 2020 ||  || 1
| 17 || 1 || 0 || 210 || 62 || 272 || 76 || 14 || 0.1 || 0.0 || 12.4 || 3.6 || 16.0 || 4.5 || 0.8 || 4
|- 
| scope=row bgcolor=F0E68C | 2021# ||  || 1
| 23 || 0 || 2 || 339 || 61 || 400 || 125 || 24 || 0.0 || 0.1 || 14.7 || 2.7 || 17.4 || 5.4 || 1.0 || 1
|-
| 2022 || || 1
| 22 || 0 || 1 || 350 || 71 || 421 || 111 || 28 || 0.0 || 0.0 || 15.9 || 3.2 || 19.1 || 5.0 || 1.3 || 0
|- 
| 2023 ||  || 1
| 0 || – || – || – || – || – || – || – || – || – || – || – || – || – || – || –
|- class=sortbottom
! colspan=3 | Career
! 193 !! 23 !! 23 !! 2262 !! 752 !! 3014 !! 987 !! 277 !! 0.1 !! 0.1 !! 11.7 !! 3.9 !! 15.6 !! 5.1 !! 1.4 !! 18
|}

Notes

Honours and achievements
Team
 AFL premiership player: 2021
 McClelland Trophy: 2021

Individual
 Gold Coast captain: 2017–2018
 2× All-Australian team: 2021, 2022
 Sid Anderson Memorial Trophy (Melbourne B&F Runner-Up): 2020
 Indigenous All-Stars team: 2013
 22under22 team: 2014

References

External links

1992 births
Indigenous Australian players of Australian rules football
Australian rules footballers from the Northern Territory
Gold Coast Football Club players
Sportspeople from Darwin, Northern Territory
People educated at Melbourne Grammar School
Living people
Northern Territory Football Club players
Southern Districts Football Club players
Melbourne Football Club players
Melbourne Football Club Premiership players
One-time VFL/AFL Premiership players